Dorcadion tebrisicum is a species of beetle in the family Cerambycidae. It was described by Plavilstshikov in 1951. It is known from Iran.

References

tebrisicum
Beetles described in 1951